Mid-Canada Communications was a Canadian media company, which operated from 1980 to 1990. The company, a division of Northern Cable, had television and radio holdings in Northeastern Ontario.

MCTV

Mid-Canada Television, or MCTV, was created in 1980 when Cambrian Broadcasting, which owned the CTV affiliates in Sudbury, North Bay and Timmins, merged with J. Conrad Lavigne's CBC affiliates in the same cities.

This twinstick structure was permitted by the Canadian Radio-television and Telecommunications Commission because both companies were on the brink of bankruptcy due to their aggressive competition for limited advertising dollars in small markets. Notably, the companies' holdings included two parallel microwave transmission systems, both of which were among the largest such systems in the world at the time, and which were technically redundant since one system can in fact carry multiple channels.

The deal represented the first time that the CRTC had ever approved direct ownership of a radio or television broadcast outlet by a cable distribution company, which is now commonplace in Canada but was explicitly forbidden by CRTC policy prior to the MCTV approval.

In its decision, however, the CRTC explicitly stated that the merger was approved as a temporary arrangement, only until the CBC could afford to directly acquire MCTV's CBC affiliates. That "temporary" deal, however, would last 22 years. Mid-Canada Communications did offer ownership of its newly-redundant second microwave network to the CBC as an interim step toward the establishment of a CBC Television production facility in the region; the CBC, however, expressed interest in keeping the negotiations open but declined to immediately purchase the system.

In response to concentration of media ownership concerns, the merged company divested itself of its predecessor companies' radio holdings CKSO and CIGM-FM in Sudbury, although it retained ownership of a couple of smaller-market radio stations and would later reacquire other radio stations in the region (see Mid-Canada Radio below.)

The MCTV stations were:

 North Bay - CKNY (CTV), CHNB (CBC)
 Sudbury - CICI (CTV), CKNC (CBC)
 Timmins - CITO (CTV), CFCL (CBC)

All six stations were primarily referred to on air as MCTV rather than by their callsigns, and were distinguished from each other by use of their network affiliation (i.e. "MCTV-CTV" and "MCTV-CBC".) Less frequently, versions of its logo were sometimes seen which included both the call sign and the MCTV branding.

Due to CTV's status at the time as a cooperative of its affiliated stations, MCTV itself held a 2.1 per cent share in the network.

As well, MCTV owned CHRO in Pembroke, a CBC affiliate in a market with no other television stations. CHRO used the same logo and programming schedule as MCTV's other stations, but it used its own callsign, rather than MCTV, as its on-air identification.

Mid-Canada Radio

In 1985, Mid-Canada Communications acquired six radio stations in Sudbury, Elliot Lake, Blind River and Espanola, which were aligned with the company's existing radio holdings in Kapuskasing, Hearst, Timmins and Pembroke into the Mid-Canada Radio group. The system expanded in the latter half of the 1980s, with further acquisitions in Sault Ste. Marie, Wawa, North Bay and another station in Kapuskasing bringing the group to 15 stations by 1990.

 Blind River - CJNR
 Elliot Lake - CKNR
 Espanola - CKNS
 Hearst - CFLH
 Kapuskasing - CFLK, CKAP
 North Bay - CHUR
 Pembroke - CHRO
 Sault Ste. Marie - CKCY, CJQM
 Sudbury - CFBR, CHNO, CJMX
 Timmins - CFCL
 Wawa - CJWA

The stations shared some news and sales resources, but were programmed independently of each other except for two shared overnight programs: one for the francophone stations (CFBR, CFLK, CFLH and CFCL), and one for the anglophone stations (all others).

Acquisition
In 1990, Northern Cable began divesting itself of its media properties. Pelmorex purchased Mid-Canada Radio, and Baton Broadcasting acquired MCTV.  Baton also purchased Sault Ste. Marie's Huron Broadcasting in 1990, and converted CHBX and CJIC to the MCTV branding as well.

Under Baton's ownership, the stations retained the MCTV branding, and became part of the Baton Broadcast System.  The CBC stations were eventually sold outright to CBC in 2002, while the CTV stations were rebranded as CTV Northern Ontario in 2003.

References

Radio broadcasting companies of Canada
Defunct broadcasting companies of Canada
Mass media companies established in 1980
Mass media companies disestablished in 1990
Companies based in Greater Sudbury
Defunct companies of Ontario
1980 establishments in Ontario
1990 disestablishments in Ontario